Senec may refer to:

Places
 Senec District, Bratislava Region, western Slovakia
 Senec, Slovakia, capital of Senec District
 Senec (Rakovník District), a village in the Central Bohemian Region, Czech Republic
 Zruč-Senec, a village in Plzeň Region, Czech Republic

Sports
 FC Senec, a football club based in Senec, Slovakia, active 1994–2008
 ŠK Senec, a football club based in Senec, Slovakia, active 1994–2016
 MŠK Senec, a football club based in Senec, Slovakia, active 2014–present

Other uses
 Senec, a German solar storage manufacturer; subsidiary of EnBW

See also
 Seneca (disambiguation)